Rabe is a village in Serbia. It is situated in the Novi Kneževac municipality, in the North Banat District, Vojvodina province. The village has a Hungarian ethnic majority (91.11%) and its population numbering 135 people (2002 census). 

A border crossing to Hungary opened in October 2019, ending the village's century isolation and renewing the traditional ties with the Hungarian village of Kübekháza.

See also
List of places in Serbia
List of cities, towns and villages in Vojvodina

Populated places in Serbian Banat
Populated places in North Banat District
Novi Kneževac